Paul Hoover may refer to:

 Paul Hoover (poet) (born 1946), American poet 
 Paul Hoover (baseball) (born 1976), American baseball player